"Ron and Tammys" is the second episode of the fourth season of the NBC sitcom Parks and Recreation. It originally aired on NBC on September 29, 2011. In the episode, Ron Swanson (Nick Offerman) is confronted by his first ex-wife, Tammy 1 (Patricia Clarkson) who has a malevolent influence on him, and Leslie Knope (Amy Poehler) becomes involved in Ron's personal life. This episode marks the first and only appearance of Ron's mother, Tamara (Paula Pell). It garnered 4.33 million viewers, an increase in viewers from the previous episode's 4.11 million.

Plot
Leslie (Amy Poehler) is preparing for the "battle royale": a big meeting between all departments where they argue over funding. Ron's (Nick Offerman) intimidating presence and libertarian beliefs are pivotal for the parks department to succeed in getting more funds over other departments, but he is too busy preparing for his upcoming tax audit served to him by his first ex-wife, Tammy 1 (Patricia Clarkson). Leslie, Andy Dwyer (Chris Pratt), and April Ludgate (Aubrey Plaza) help Ron but discover he has few actual receipts, just notes of purchase that he wrote himself and photographs of gentlemen's agreements. He does, however, have large amounts of gold that he has buried all over Pawnee. Ron explains that Tammy I had been present throughout most of his young life: she delivered him as a baby, was his teacher, and she even took his virginity. However, she was cold and controlling, which forever turned Ron off to blonde women after their divorce.

Tammy I is horrified at Ron's recordkeeping and demands access to every part of his life for the audit. Tammy I's strict maternal nature intimidates everyone into following her orders, which impresses April. Over the course of the next week, Tammy I moves back in with Ron and assumes complete control over him. Ron shaves off his moustache, becomes kind, and refuses to do anything without Tammy I's approval. Leslie needs Ron to be his usual gruff self for the battle royale and confronts Tammy I about the audit, which she admits is fake - she decided to take Ron back after learning about all the gold he had.

Leslie asks Ron's second ex-wife Tammy 2 (Megan Mullally) for help, but even she is scared of Tammy I after she attacked her with acid. They decide to ask Ron's survivalist mother, Tamara (Paula Pell) - nicknamed Tammy, or Tammy 0 - for help and she agrees. Tammy 0 challenges Tammy I to a "prairie drink-off" of highly alcoholic Swanson family mash liquor, but Tammy 0 says Ron will return to the farm forever if she wins. Leslie enters the drinking contest to save Ron from his mother and ex-wife, but the liquor immediately makes her too drunk to continue. Ron, finally fed up over people controlling him, chugs the jug dry and tells both Tammys to leave him alone.

In a subplot, Tom Haverford (Aziz Ansari) asks Ben Wyatt (Adam Scott) to look over the finances of his company, Entertainment 720. Ben discovers that Tom and Jean-Ralphio Saperstein (Ben Schwartz) are wasting large amounts of money on a state-of-the-art office, giving employees high salaries with full benefits, and paying Detlef Schrempf and Roy Hibbert to play basketball all day, despite having no income. They ignore Ben's warnings that the company will go bankrupt in a month, but Tom later apologizes to Ben after discovering that he was right.

In another subplot, Ann Perkins (Rashida Jones) asks Chris Traeger (Rob Lowe) to film a quick Public Service Announcement about diabetes, but the overly-enthusiastic Chris spends all day doing countless takes, making Ann wonder why she even dated him in the first place.

Reception
Many critics gave praise to the episode. IGN called it "the perfect call-back episode." AV Club described it as "a hilarious ode to Parks & Rec’s characters."

References

External links 
 

2011 American television episodes
Parks and Recreation (season 4) episodes